Minsk-2 was a Belarusian football club based in Minsk and was a reserve team of FC Minsk.

History
The team was formed in 1954 as FShM Minsk (Futbolnaya Shkhola Molodyozhi, or Football School of Youth) and was essentially a student team. During Soviet years, they spent the most of their seasons playing only in youth competitions, although they also spent several seasons in senior Belarusian SSR league. They adopted name Smena Minsk in 1989.

In 1992 Smena joined newly created Belarusian Second League. After several seasons spent in Second and First leagues as well as one season (1996) at youth level, the team partnered BATE Borisov and became their reserve/feeder team under the name Smena-BATE Minsk. The partnership ended in 2000 and the team reverted their name to Smena Minsk.

In 2005, while playing in the First League, they launched their own reserve team Smena-2 Minsk, who joined Second League.

In early 2006 a new senior professional team FC Minsk was founded on the basis of Smena. The new team took over Smena's First League license, the majority of the squad and facilities, and replaced Smena in the First League. A reserve team Smena-2 was renamed to Smena for the 2006 season and was folded by the end of the year, as Minsk got promoted to Belarusian Premier League and now had to sign a reserve squad for a separate Premier League Reserves competition.

A successor team Minsk-2 was created to participate in 2008 Second League season, after Minsk briefly relegated back to the First League. Minsk-2 was reformed again in 2012 as a ground for Minsk football academy graduates. After finishing the season at 5th place, Minsk-2 was invited to join First League as a replacement for disbanded DSK Gomel.

In early 2015, FC Minsk announced that their farm-club Minsk-2 was folded.

League and Cup history 
{|class="wikitable"
|-bgcolor="#efefef"
! Season
! League
! Pos.
! Pl.
! W
! D
! L
! GS
! GA
! P
!Cup
!Notes
!    Manager

|-
|1992
|bgcolor=#98bb98|3D
|align=right bgcolor=gold|1
|align=right|15||align=right|10||align=right|1||align=right|4
|align=right|49||align=right|15||align=right|21
|Last 32
|
|
|-
|1992–93
|bgcolor=#ffa07a|2D
|align=right|8
|align=right|30||align=right|12||align=right|6||align=right|12
|align=right|42||align=right|50||align=right|30
|Last 64
|
|
|-
|1993–94
|bgcolor=#ffa07a|2D
|align=right|15
|align=right|28||align=right|3||align=right|7||align=right|18
|align=right|15||align=right|50||align=right|13
|Last 32
|Relegated
|
|-
|1994–95
|bgcolor=#98bb98|3D – B
|align=right|7
|align=right|22||align=right|8||align=right|3||align=right|11
|align=right|23||align=right|35||align=right|19
|
|
|
|-
|1995
|bgcolor=#98bb98|3D – B
|align=right|4
|align=right|12||align=right|6||align=right|1||align=right|5
|align=right|23||align=right|14||align=right|19
|
|
|
|-
|align=center colspan=13|?
|-
|1997
|bgcolor=#98bb98|3D – A
|align=right|6
|align=right|26||align=right|12||align=right|2||align=right|12
|align=right|52||align=right|46||align=right|38
|
|
|
|-
|1998
|bgcolor=#98bb98|3D – A
|align=right|4
|align=right|26||align=right|14||align=right|7||align=right|5
|align=right|55||align=right|23||align=right|49
|
|
|
|-
|1999
|bgcolor=#98bb98|3D – A
|align=right bgcolor=silver|2
|align=right|24||align=right|16||align=right|3||align=right|5
|align=right|54||align=right|22||align=right|51
|
|
|
|-
|align=center colspan=13|?
|-
|2001
|bgcolor=#98bb98|3D
|align=right|18
|align=right|34||align=right|1||align=right|1||align=right|32
|align=right|13||align=right|119||align=right|4
|
|
|
|-
|align=center colspan=13|2002 in lower league
|-
|2003
|bgcolor=#98bb98|3D
|align=right|5
|align=right|22||align=right|12||align=right|4||align=right|6
|align=right|50||align=right|26||align=right|40
|
|
|
|-
|2004
|bgcolor=#98bb98|3D
|align=right bgcolor=gold|1
|align=right|24||align=right|19||align=right|1||align=right|4
|align=right|55||align=right|17||align=right|58
|
|
|
|-
|2005
|bgcolor=#ffa07a|2D
|align=right|5
|align=right|30||align=right|14||align=right|8||align=right|8
|align=right|31||align=right|23||align=right|50
|
|1
|
|-
|2006
|bgcolor=#98bb98|3D
|align=right|13
|align=right|32||align=right|6||align=right|9||align=right|17
|align=right|36||align=right|68||align=right|27
|Second round
|
|
|-
|2007
|bgcolor=#98bb98|3D
|align=right|
|align=right| ||align=right| ||align=right| ||align=right|
|align=right| ||align=right| ||align=right|
|
|
|
|-
|2008
|bgcolor=#98bb98|3D
|align=right|
|align=right| ||align=right| ||align=right| ||align=right|
|align=right| ||align=right| ||align=right|
|
|
|
|-
|}

1Zmena-2 Minsk in Third level, club license transferred to FC Minsk. Zmena-2 Minsk became first team in 2006.

External links 
Profile at FC Minsk website

Defunct football clubs in Belarus
Football clubs in Minsk
Association football clubs established in 1954
Association football clubs disestablished in 2015
1954 establishments in Belarus
2015 disestablishments in Belarus